The West Indian whistling duck (Dendrocygna arborea) is a whistling duck that breeds in the Caribbean. Alternative names are black-billed whistling duck and Cuban whistling duck.

Distribution
The West Indian whistling duck is widely scattered throughout the West Indies, including a large breeding population in the Bahamas, and smaller numbers in Cuba, the Cayman Islands, Antigua and Barbuda, Jamaica, Hispaniola (both the Dominican Republic and Haiti), and Puerto Rico. It is largely sedentary, apart from local movements, which can be 100 km or more.

Description
The West Indian whistling duck is the largest and darkest of the whistling ducks. It has a long black bill, long head and longish legs. It has a pale foreneck and light brown face. The crown, back, breast and wings are dark brown to black, and the rest of the underparts are white with heavy black markings.

All plumages are similar, except that juveniles are duller and have a less contrasted belly pattern.

Breeding
Nests have been reported in tree cavities, on branches, in clumps of bromeliads, and on the ground under thatch palms and other dense bushes. The usual clutch size is 10-16 eggs. It habitually perches in trees, which gives rise to its specific name.

Diet and behavior
The birds are mostly nocturnal and secretive, inhabiting wooded swamps and mangroves, where this duck roosts and feeds on plant food including the fruit of the royal palm.

Threats 
The West Indian whistling duck has suffered extensive hunting for its eggs and for sport. Wetlands are a very limited habitat in the Caribbean, with continuing conversion for development and agriculture. More than 50% of remaining wetlands are seriously degraded by the cutting of mangroves and swamp-forest, pollution (especially over-use of pesticides1) and natural catastrophes such as droughts and hurricanes. Predation is inadequately documented but may be a factor.

Current conservation measures 
D. arborea is ranked under CITES Appendix II, as well as CMS Appendix II. It is legally protected throughout much of its range, but law enforcement is inadequate.  The West Indian Whistling Duck Working Group initiated a conservation programme in 1997. There are several protected areas in the region but, in general, suitable habitat, especially wetlands, is under-represented. Ducks are predated on Antigua and Barbuda by the small Indian mongooses introduced to control the cane rats which was largely unsuccessful as the rats live in trees.

Proposed conservation measures 
Conduct extensive surveys to assess numbers and distribution; assist local authorities in establishing a long-term monitoring programme; conserve key sites; enforce legal protection; initiate public education and awareness programmes.

References 

 Wildfowl by Madge and Burn, 
 Staus, N.L. 1998. Behavior and natural history of the West Indian Whistling Duck on Long Island, Bahamas. Wildfowl 49: 194–206.

External links

BirdLife Species Factsheet., birdlife.org
ARKive - images and movies of the West Indian whistling-duck (Dendrocygna arborea)

West Indian whistling duck
Endemic birds of the Caribbean
Birds of the Dominican Republic
Birds of Haiti
West Indian whistling duck
West Indian whistling duck